Sun Chengyao (Chinese:孙成耀) (born February 13, 1952) is a Chinese football coach and a former football player. Since becoming a coach he has predominantly been an assistant and has helped coach the Chinese youth teams as well as China women's team before returning to club coaching.

Club career
Sun Chengyao started his football career with the Dalian Team's youth team before he joined the senior team of Chengdu Budui football club.

Management career
After he retired Sun Chengyao would return to his home town and begin his management career when he would coach the Dalian Wanda FC youth team. After spending nine years in producing players who had successful careers when they graduated to the senior team Sun Chengyao would move up to assistant coaching. This caught the attention of the Chinese Under-20 football team as well as the Chinese Under-23 football team who wanted him to be an assistant for them. Unable to help China qualify for the Football at the 2004 Summer Olympics he would return to club football.

He would return to club football as an assistant coach to second-tier football club Changchun Yatai where he was part of the staff that aided the club to promotion to the top tier, however after that achievement the entire management team left after accusations over match-fixing and pay disputes. While there were no foundations to these rumours Sun soon found work with the Chinese women team before joining Guangzhou Pharmaceutical until the manager Shen Xiangfu left the club and Sun joined him. When Shen Xiangfu soon joined Changchun Yatai, Sun was included in his coaching staff despite his previous hostile exit from the club.

References

External links
Guangzhou profile at sina.com
Guangzhou profile at official site

1952 births
Living people
Chinese footballers
Footballers from Dalian
Chinese football managers
Association footballers not categorized by position